Fort Misery may refer to:

 Fort Misery, Arizona, a populated place in Arizona
 Fort Misery, the oldest log cabin in Arizona, now on the grounds of the Sharlot Hall Museum
 Fort Misery was another name for Fort Davy Crockett, a 19th-century trading post in Colorado